Primordial Lovers is the second studio album by American singer-songwriter Essra Mohawk. Released on June 6, 1970, the album sold poorly. In 2000 the album was re-released by Rhino Handmade as a 22-track collection, combining the original album with a non-album single, "Jabberwock Song", and the 1974 follow-up album, Essra Mohawk.

The original 1970 Reprise issue of the album included a 20-page booklet with the album's song lyrics. In 2010 the original album was reissued by Collectors' Choice with five extra tracks.

Track listing of original album
All tracks are composed by Essra Mohawk.
 "I Am the Breeze" 
 "Spiral"
 "I'll Give It to You Anyway"
 "I Have Been Here Before" 
 "Looking Forward to the Dawn"
 "Thunder in the Morning" 
 "Lion on the Wing" 
 "It's Up to Me"
 "It's Been a Beautiful Day"

Additional tracks

 "Jabberwock Song" 
 "Image of You" 
 "New Skins for Old" 
 "Openin' My Love Doors"
 "Full Fledged Woman" 
 "You're Finally Here" 
 "Summertime" 
 "Back in the Spirit" 
 "You Make Me Come to Pieces" 
 "I Cannot Forget" 
 "Song to an Unborn Soul" 
 "If I'm Going to Go Crazy With Someone, It Might As Well Be You" 
 "Magic Pen"

Personnel
 Essra Mohawk – piano, vocals, arrangements
 Jerry Hahn - guitars (tracks: A2, B4, B5)
 Lee Underwood - guitar on "I Have Been Here Before"
 Doug Hastings - guitar (tracks: A3, B2)
 Dallas Taylor - drums (tracks: A3, B2)
 George Marsh - drums (tracks: A2, B4, B5)
 James Zitro - drums on "I Have Been Here Before"
 Mel Graves - bass (tracks: A2, B4, B5)
 Jerry Penrod - bass (tracks: A3, B2)
 Bruce Cale, Kenneth Jenkins - bass on "I Have Been Here Before"
 Mike Cohen - organ on "I Have Been Here Before"
 Joe Keefe - vibraphone, finger cymbals on "I Have Been Here Before"
 Bert Wilson - tenor saxophone on "I Have Been Here Before"
 Al Aarons, Warren Gale - trumpet on "I Have Been Here Before"
 Kenny Shroyer - trombone on "I Have Been Here Before"
 Phil Teele - bass trombone on "I Have Been Here Before"
 Gale Robinson - French horn on "I Have Been Here Before"
 George St. John - oboe (tracks: A1, B4)
 Peter Pilafian - violin on "Lion On the Wing"
 John Meyers, Mike Dubkin - flute on "	It's Up To Me"
Technical
Brian Ross-Myring, Phil Sawyer, Fritz Richmond, Leonard Roberts - engineer
John Haeny - mixing
Ed Thrasher - art direction
Barry Feinstein - photography

References

rhino.com

1970 albums
Essra Mohawk albums
Rhino Handmade albums